The Austin-Healey 100-6 is a two-seat roadster that was announced in late September 1956 and produced from 1956 until 1959. A replacement for the Austin-Healey 100, it was followed by the Austin-Healey 3000; together, the three models have become known as the Big Healeys.

The 100-6 featured a  longer wheelbase than the 100, a more powerful  straight-six engine in place of its slightly larger inline-four, and added two occasional seats (which later became optional). The body lines were slightly streamlined, a smaller, wider radiator grille placed lower, an air scoop was added to the bonnet, and the windscreen fixed.

The 100-6 was produced in two model designators, the 2+2 BN4 from 1956 onwards and the 2-seat BN6 in 1958–9.

The previously standard overdrive unit was made optional.

In late 1957 production was transferred from Longbridge to the MG plant at Abingdon. 14,436 100-6s were produced before production ended in 1959.

The test car cost £1307 including taxes of £436.

References

External links

 Austin Memories—History of Austin and Longbridge
 Volunteer register with records and photos of the 100

100
Roadsters
Rear-wheel-drive vehicles
Cars introduced in 1956
24 Hours of Le Mans race cars